Claude Boissol (1920–2016) was a French film and television director and screenwriter.  He co-created the long-running crime television series Commissaire Moulin.

Selected filmography
 Three Boys, One Girl (1948)
 The King of the Bla Bla Bla (1951)
 Monsieur Leguignon, Signalman (1952)
 The Drunkard (1953)
 The Fighting Drummer (1953)
 The Contessa's Secret (1954)
 Rasputin (1954)
 The Whole Town Accuses (1956)
 Julie the Redhead (1959)
 Napoleon II, the Eagle (1961)

References

Bibliography
 Andrew, Dudley & Gillain, Anne . A Companion to François Truffaut. John Wiley & Sons, 2013.
 Rège, Philippe. Encyclopedia of French Film Directors, Volume 1. Scarecrow Press, 2009.

External links

1920 births
2016 deaths
French screenwriters
French film directors
People from Paris

fr:Claude Boissol